Manoj Basu (25 July 1901–27 December 1987) was an Indian writer of Bengali novels, and short stories. He is most well known for his novel
Nishi-Kutumba. He won the 1966 Sahitya Akademi Award in Bengali for this novel.

Life

Manoj Basu was born on 25 July 1901. He wrote many novels and short stories in Bengali. He established the well known Bengal Publishers Pvt. Ltd. in Calcutta (now Kolkata). He died on 27 December 1987.

Works

 Nishi-Kutumba (নিশিকুটুম্ব) 
 Bon Kete Basat (বন কেটে বসত)
 Jal Jungle (জল জঙ্গল)
 Bokul (বকুল) 
 Ek Bihangee (এক বিহঙ্গী) 
 Sei Gram Sei Sab Manush (সেই গ্রাম সেই সব মানুষ) 
 Brishti Brishti (বৃষ্টি বৃষ্টি)
 Amar Fansi Holo (আমার ফাঁসি হল) 
 Rupobati (রূপবতী) 
 Ami Samrat (আমি সম্রাট)
 Khadyot (খদ্যোত)

References

1901 births
1987 deaths
20th-century Indian novelists
Writers from West Bengal